This is an episode list for the Japanese jidaigeki television series Zatoichi.

Season 1 [1974]

Season 2 [1976]

Season 3 [1978]

Season 4 [1979]

Zatoichi
Zatoichi
Zatoichi